The Anglican Diocese of Jalingo is one of ten within the Anglican Province of Jos, itself one of 14 provinces within the Church of Nigeria. The current bishop is Foreman Nedison.

Notes

Church of Nigeria dioceses
Dioceses of the Province of Jos